Sde Eliezer (lit. Eliezer's Field) is a moshav in northern Israel. Located in the Hula Valley, it falls under the jurisdiction of Mevo'ot HaHermon Regional Council.

History
Sde Eliezer was founded in 1950 by residents of Yesod HaMa'ala and Kiryat Shmona. Jewish immigrants from Czechoslovakia, Yugoslavia, Poland and Romania also settled there. The moshav was named for Robert (Eliezer) Rothschild, grandson of Edmond de Rothschild, founder of the Palestine Jewish Colonization Association (PICA).

According to some sources the village was built on land which had been bought by PICA, while according to Walid Khalidi, it was established on land that had belonged to the depopulated Palestinian village of al-Husayniyya.

Notable residents
Eliezer Marom

References

Moshavim
Populated places in Northern District (Israel)
Populated places established in 1950
Romanian-Jewish culture in Israel
1950 establishments in Israel
Czech-Jewish culture in Israel
Slovak-Jewish culture in Israel
Polish-Jewish culture in Israel
Yugoslav-Jewish culture in Israel